Amancio Ortega Gaona (born 28 March 1936) is a Spanish billionaire businessman. He is the founder and former chairman of Inditex fashion group, best known for its chain of Zara  and Bershka clothing and accessories shops. As of November 2022, Ortega had a net worth of $62.9 billion, making him the third-wealthiest person in Europe after Bernard Arnault and Francoise Bettencourt Meyers, and the 18th-wealthiest in the world. For a brief period of time in 2015, he was the richest man in the world, surpassing Bill Gates when his net worth peaked to $80 billion as Zara's parent company, Inditex's, stock peaked.

He is the head of the Ortega family and the second wealthiest retailer in the world.

Early life and education
The youngest of four children, Ortega was born in Busdongo de Arbas, León, Spain, to Antonio Ortega Rodríguez and Josefa Gaona Hernández from the province of Valladolid, and spent his childhood in Tolosa, Gipuzkoa.

He left school and moved to A Coruña at the age of 14, due to the job of his father, a railway worker. Shortly after, he found a job as a shop hand for a local shirtmaker called Gala, which still sits on the same corner in downtown A Coruña, and learned to make clothes by hand.

Career
In 1963, he founded Confecciones Goa to sell quilted bathrobes.

In 1975, he opened his first Zara store with his wife Rosalía Mera.

In 2009, Zara was part of the Inditex group (Industrias de Diseño Textil Sociedad Anónima), of which Ortega owned 59.29%, and aside from over 6,000 stores included the brands Zara, Massimo Dutti, Oysho, Zara Home, Kiddy's Class, Tempe, Stradivarius, Pull and Bear, Bershka and has more than 92,000 employees.

His public appearance in 2000, as part of the warm-up prior to his company's initial public offering on the stock market in 2001, made headlines in the Spanish financial press. However, he has only ever granted interviews to three journalists.

In 2011, Ortega announced his imminent retirement from Inditex, parent company of the Zara chain, stating that he would ask Inditex vice-president and CEO Pablo Isla to take his place as head. In 2012 Ortega donated about €20 million to Caritas Internationalis, a Roman Catholic relief organisation.

He purchased the Torre Picasso skyscraper in Madrid. He also purchased the Epic Residences and Hotel in Miami, Florida.

In July 2017, for its second edition of the AEF awards, the Spanish Association of Foundations awarded Amancio Ortega in the 2017 Philanthropic Initiative category. He also donated 300 million euros to fight cancer across Spain, which were invested in the purchase of 440 machines to detect the disease. As a result of this, the number of Spanish public hospitals equipped with stereotactic radiotherapy machines has risen from 20 to 70. However, these decisions were not unanimously welcomed and were criticized by some political parties like Podemos. Recently, news indicate that he has bought the Troy Block complex, known to the public as one of the buildings where Amazon Seattle has its headquarters.

It was revealed in July 2020 that Ortega's property holdings, through his investment company Pontegadea, were worth $17.2 billion. Ortega is the executive chairman of Pontegadea, and real estate assets in his portfolio include Manhattan’s Haughwout Building and Southeast Financial Center. In 2019, the company completed a $72.5 million deal for a downtown Chicago hotel, which followed purchases of a building in Washington’s central business district and two Seattle office buildings.

Ortega was reported to have lost $10 billion as a result of the coronavirus pandemic.

Personal life
 
Ortega is very private about his personal life, and as of 2012 he has only given three interviews to journalists. Ortega is very reclusive and keeps a very low profile. Until 1999, no photograph of Ortega had ever been published. 

He likes to dress simply, refuses to wear a tie, and typically prefers to wear a simple uniform of a blue blazer, white shirt, and gray trousers, none of which are Zara products.

He married Rosalía Mera Goyenechea in 1966, they had two children, Marcos and Sandra Ortega Mera, the couple divorced in 1986. Mera died in August 2013 at the age of 69. He married his second wife Flora Pérez Marcote in 2001, with whom he had a daughter, Marta Ortega Pérez, in 1984 . As of 2017, despite owning a huge real estate portfolio he mostly lives with his wife in his apartment in A Coruña, Spain.

He is mostly spotted being driven around in a black Mercedes-Benz S-Class (W221) and a black Mercedes-Benz GL-Class (X166). He owns two yachts "Drizzle" and "Valoria B" as well as Gulfstream G650 and Bombardier Global Express private jets.

See also 
 List of billionaires
 List of Spanish billionaires by net worth

Bibliography

References

External links

 Amancio Ortega Gaona at Forbes
 Amancio Ortega Gaona at Bloomberg L.P.

1936 births
Living people
Spanish businesspeople in fashion
Businesspeople from Galicia (Spain)
People from Montaña Occidental
Grand Cross of the Order of Civil Merit
Spanish billionaires
Spanish chief executives
20th-century Spanish businesspeople
21st-century Spanish businesspeople
Directors of Inditex